Mazama  may refer to:
 Mazama, Washington (pop. 230), a small village nestled in the Methow Valley in the eastern part of Washington
 Mazama, the genus name of the Brocket deer
 Mount Mazama, a destroyed stratovolcano in Oregon whose caldera contains Crater Lake
 The Mazamas, a mountaineering club based in Portland, Oregon
 Mazama High School, located near Klamath Falls, Oregon, named for Mount Mazama
 Lucanus mazama, a stag beetle of the family Lucanidae